Drugera santiago is a moth of the family Notodontidae. It is found in north-eastern Ecuador.

The length of the forewings is about 22.5 mm. The ground colour of the forewings is a mixture of charcoal grey and silvery white scales. The ground colour of the hindwings is dirty light grey-brown.

Etymology
The species is derived from the province of Morona-Santiago in southern Ecuador, where the species was first collected in 1979.

References

Moths described in 2011
Notodontidae